Shahid Masood is a Pakistani columnist and political analyst who hosts the talk show Live with Dr. Shahid Masood on GNN. He is known for his series End of Time on ARY.

Previously, he served as Group executive director of Geo TV and senior Executive Director of ARY Digital Network. In 2008, he was briefly appointed as the managing director and chairman of Pakistan Television Corporation and also served as the special assistant to then-Prime Minister of Pakistan Yousaf Raza Gillani with the status of a minister of state in the Gillani ministry.

Personal life and education
Masood was born to a Pashtun-Kakazai family in Karachi. In a 2004 interview to Arab News, Masood said that his father was a civil engineer in Saudi Arabia who worked there for 15 years while, his mother is a teacher. According to him, he spent his childhood in Taif and Riyadh. For seven years, he went to the Pakistan International School in Riyadh. According to Arab News, He is married and has two daughters and a son. Two of his younger brothers were born in Saudi Arabia so the country is close to him.

He is a medical doctor by profession. He received an MBBS degree from Jinnah Sindh Medical University. Masood did his major in International Relations and Defence Studies from the Fletcher School of Law and Diplomacy.

Career in journalism

ARY news executive and PTV Chairman (2001–08)
Masood became affiliated with the media in 2001. He initially served as the senior Executive Director of ARY Digital Network, where he served as the chief of ARY One World (now known as ARY News), and hosted the show Views on News.

In 2005, Masood received a scholarship with CNN. He also carried out coverage of the three wars in Afghanistan, Iraq and Lebanon. In 2007, Masood joined Geo TV as its Group Executive Director where he hosted the TV show Meray Mutabaq.

In June 2008, Masood was appointed as the Chairman of Pakistan Television Corporation (PTV) with the additional charge of Managing Director at PTV on a two-year contract. However, in November 2008 he resigned from his position as chairman and managing director of PTV. Following the resignation, he was appointed as special assistant to the then-Prime Minister of Pakistan Yousaf Raza Gillani with the status of a minister.

According to Daily Times, Masood was asked to resign from PTV by the then-President of Pakistan Asif Ali Zardari. According to Dawn, this came following mounting tensions between Masood and the then-Minister of Information Sherry Rehman when the former refused to take back deputy managing director PTV Shahid Nadeem and cancelled his reinstatement orders. Masood also suspended PTV director administration and personnel, and issued him a show-cause notice for complying with the prime minister's orders and allowing Nadeem to rejoin the organization as deputy MD. Ministry of Information was also dissatisfied by the audit of PTV under Masood's chairmanship and his decision to increase salaries of PTV staff at the time of a financial crunch. Masood was supposed to pay six months' salary to PTV in case of resigning as per contract terms, which however was waived by the then-prime minister.

Geo News, ARY News, Express News, CNBC Pakistan, News One, Bol News, GNN (2008 since)
Masood again joined Geo News and Meray Mutabiq in November 2008 before shifting to Views on News on ARY News in 2010. Masood started hosting his current affairs show Shahid Nama on Express News in 2011. The show followed a similar pattern to his earlier current affairs and politics. Before General Election 2013, Masood joined Royal News for the election coverage. In December 2013, he joined Jaag TV (formerly CNBC Pakistan) where he hosted his show Live with Dr. Shahid Masood.

In 2014, he joined News One (Pakistani TV channel) and started a show Live with Dr. Shahid Masood, as a guest journalist. The show then shifted to ARY News in February 2016, and then on Bol News from late 2016 till February 2017. The show then returned to News One (Pakistani TV channel) on 14 February 2017.

Masood also had presented documentary on Islamic eschatology entitled End of Time: The Hidden Truth in 2004 from ARY News. He then refreshed and represented them as The Lost Chapters from News One (Pakistani TV channel) in 2015, Final Call from ARY News in 2016 and The Moment from News One (Pakistani TV channel) in 2017.

In 2019 he left News One (Pakistani TV channel) and joined GNN News as President where he hosts the show "Live With Dr Shahid Masood".

Controversies and subsequent lawsuits
In 2010, Express Tribune reported that a Karachi resident filed a petition against Masood and asked the court to take action against him for encouraging cultural hatred through his TV show.

In 2013, Dawn reported that an anti-terrorism court in Pakistan ordered Masood to telecast an apology for telecasting derogatory remarks on the judiciary after which Masood submitted written apologies before the court.

In March 2016, Finance Minister of Pakistan Ishaq Dar sent a legal notice to Masood for allegedly leveling baseless allegations in his TV programme and demanded that Masood offer an apology and pay  compensation. In August 2016, PEMRA imposed a 45-day ban on Shahid Masood's show airing on the ARY News after Masood alleged in a programme that the chief justice of Sindh High Court took a bribe and later did not fulfil his promises. He was also banned from participating in any other TV show during this 45-day period.

In January 2017, Ishaq Dar again sent a legal notice to Bol News, demanding an apology for false and defamatory statements, aired in Masood's show on 24 January. On 13 February, PEMRA decided to ban his show for 30 days, and fine was charged on the channel for making baseless allegations against the federal ministers for finance and defence.

In March 2018, JIT declared that Masood's report about Zainab murder case was false and baseless, for which he was banned for 3 months from hosting his TV show by the Supreme Court. He resumed hosting the show on 21 June 2018 on News One.

In November 2018, he was arrested by FIA in the PTV corruption case.

Books
Views on news, Lahore : Mavra, 2004, 238 p. Current political social issues, views of author expressed in a talk show telecast on ARY Digital channel.
End of time, Lahore : Mavra, 2005, 136 p. Transcript by Khalid Sharif of a documentary series that deals with a variety of subjects ranging from minor, major signs of the end of the world, or end of times: Imam Mahdi, the return of Jesus, Armageddon, Dajjal, and other topics.

References

External links

Living people
Pakistani documentary filmmakers
Pakistani prisoners and detainees
Pakistan Television Corporation executives
Pakistani conspiracy theorists
Journalists from Karachi
Pakistani media executives
BOL Network people
Pakistani Muslims
1967 births
9/11 conspiracy theorists
Pashtun people
20th-century Pakistani physicians